Sports Boulevard is a proposed large-scale linear park located in Riyadh, Saudi Arabia, it was launched by King Salman on March 19, 2019. It is one of the largest projects in the world.  It is supervised and operated by the Sports Boulevard Foundation with its chairman Crown Prince Mohammed bin Salman bin Abdulaziz Al Saud.

Background 
The project was launched in 2019 as a part of the Kingdom of Saudi Arabia's Vision 2030. The Sports Boulevard was one of four initiatives established in 2019 along with King Salman Park, Riyadh Art and Green Riyadh with an estimated cost of $23 billion in government funding. In 2019, when the project was launched, it was expected to provide production jobs, followed by more service jobs on an ongoing basis. In April 2022, Jayne McGivern was appointed the CEO of the Sports Boulevard Foundation. In October 2021, the foundation was awarded contracts worth $661.5 million for the project's construction phase one.

Location and districts 
The Sports Boulevard is located in Riyadh and stretches 135 km connecting Wadi Hanifa in the west with Wadi Al-Sulai in the east through Prince Mohammed bin Salman Road and has 8 diverse districts, Wadi Hanifah District, Arts District, Wadi Alyasen District, Entertainment District, Athletics District, Sand Sports Park, Eco District and Wadi Al-Sulai District.

References 

2019 establishments in Saudi Arabia
Projects established in 2019
Parks in Riyadh
Proposed infrastructure in Saudi Arabia
Proposed populated places
Neighbourhoods in Riyadh
Linear parks